Sujeong-gu is a district (gu) in Seongnam, Gyeonggi-do, South Korea.

Dong 동; 洞("Neighborhood")

Stations (excludes Bokjeong station)

Seoul Subway Line 8
821 Sanseong
822 Namhansanseong (before 1998:Dandae)
823 Dandaeogeori
824 Sinheung
825 Sujin
826 Moran

Bundang Line
K223 Gachon Univ.
K224 Taepyeong
K225 Moran

Universities
Gachon University
Dong Seoul College
gachon.ac.kr/english/

Other schools
Seoul International School

Military Facilities
Seoul Air Base (K-16)

References

External links 
 
 Gyeonggi Women's Development Center

Districts of Seongnam